Painting with Paulson was a painting TV series hosted by artist Buck Paulson. The series teaches a variety of techniques, primarily with landscapes, using mixed oil and acrylic paints. 13 half-hour episodes have been produced annually since 1997, with all but the first season produced  by Prairie Public Television. Paulson and Prairie Public have also produced more instructionally focused programs, called Painting Concepts and Beyond the Canvas.

References

External links
Painting Concepts with Buck Paulson on YouTube
Painting with Paulson series 10 preview on YouTube
Painting with Paulson on Create
Painting with Paulson on NETA

1997 American television series debuts
2000s American television series
2010s American television series
English-language television shows
American non-fiction television series
Works about painting
Television series about art